George Francis Moutry Hardwick (2 February 1920 – 19 April 2004) was an English footballer, manager and coach. During his time as an active player, he was a left-sided defender for Middlesbrough and Oldham Athletic. He was also a member of the England national football team, playing in 13 international matches and serving as the team's first post-World War II captain in all 13 of those matches. The only England player to be captain in every game.

In 1947, the nations of Great Britain joined to form a football team, which Hardwick captained and led to victory (6–1) against the rest of Europe.

Owing to a knee injury Hardwick had to terminate his international career after 12 matches. He is held in high esteem by Middlesbrough fans, and is regarded as the greatest defender in the club's history.

After his career as a player, Hardwick served as player manager for Oldham Athletic and manager for PSV Eindhoven, and for six months in 1957, the Netherlands national football team. He later managed Sunderland A.F.C. and Gateshead.

Today his legacy lives on in the form of The George Hardwick Foundation, a charity dedicated to helping carers, former carers and patients. The Patron is his wife Jennifer, who cared for George during his latter years. They have three main sites at Stockton, Middlesbrough and The University Hospital of North Tees.

References

External links
George Hardwick, Post War English & Scottish Football League A – Z Player's Database

1920 births
2004 deaths
People from Saltburn-by-the-Sea
Footballers from North Yorkshire
English footballers
Association football defenders
England international footballers
England wartime international footballers
Middlesbrough F.C. players
Oldham Athletic A.F.C. players
English Football League players
English Football League representative players
English football managers
Oldham Athletic A.F.C. managers
Netherlands national football team managers
PSV Eindhoven managers
Sunderland A.F.C. managers
Gateshead A.F.C. managers
English Football League managers
English expatriate football managers
Expatriate football managers in the Netherlands
English expatriate sportspeople in the Netherlands